Shakeel Azmi (born 1971) is an Indian lyricist and poet. Born in Azamgarh, India, he writes in Urdu language and is primarily known for his contribution as a film lyricist in Bollywood. Most of his poetry revolves around ghazals, a genre of Urdu poetry.

Filmography
As lyricist

Publications 
 
 Pokhar Mein Singhaade, Childhood Biography (Poetry Collection) – 2014
 Mitti Mein Aasmaan (Poetry Collection) – 2012
 Khizan Ka Mausam Ruka Hua Hai 9 Poetry Collection – 2010
 Raasta bulata Hai (Poetry Collection) – 2005
 Ashtray (Poetry Collection) – 2000
 Dhoop Dariya (Poetry Collection) – 1996

References

External links
 
 Shakeel Azmi at Rekhta

Indian male poets
Indian lyricists
1971 births
Living people
Poets from Uttar Pradesh
Urdu-language poets from India
People from Azamgarh